The Bayer designation Delta Telescopii (δ Tel, δ Telescopii) is shared by two stars in the southern constellation Telescopium. They are separated by 0.16° on the sky.

 δ1 Telescopii
 δ2 Telescopii

Telescopii, Delta
Telescopium (constellation)